Flavobacterium dankookense is a Gram-negative, rod-shaped and strictly aerobic bacterium from the genus of Flavobacterium which has been isolated from a freshwater lake from Cheonan in Korea.

References

 

dankookense
Bacteria described in 2012